Hermann Stenner (12 March 1891, Bielefeld – 5 December 1914, near Iłów (German: Enlau)) was a German Expressionist painter and graphic artist.

Biography 

His father, Hugo, was a decorative painter. He attended the local Arts and Crafts school and honed his skills by making copies of old paintings. In 1909, he passed the entrance examination at the Academy of Fine Arts, Munich, and was assigned to the drawing class of Heinrich Knirr. That summer, he spent some time with Hans von Hayek at his art school in Dachau. Both Von Hayek and Knirr recommended that he leave Munich to study with Christian Landenberger in Stuttgart. 

In 1910, he enrolled at the State Academy of Fine Arts. After a year of study with Landenberger, he took composition classes from Adolf Hölzel, whose teaching methods differed from anything he had experienced before; treating art as a type of science. In 1912, he became one of Hölzel's master pupils at his studio in the garden of Stuttgart Castle. Later that year, he spent four weeks with his friends in Paris.

In 1913, he was invited to exhibit at the first Expressionist art exhibition in Dresden. That same year, Hölzel was able to secure him a position painting murals in the main lobby of the upcoming Werkbund Exhibition, where he worked with Oskar Schlemmer and Willi Baumeister. The response to their work ranged from enthusiastic praise to categorical rejection.

Following the outbreak of World War I, Stenner and Schlemmer volunteered and were assigned to Grenadier Regiment #119 ("Königin Olga"). After serving for two months on the Western Front, the regiment was transferred to the Eastern Front in Poland, where he was killed during an attack on Iłów in Sochaczew County in the Masovian Voivodeship .

Despite his short working life, he was able to create 280 paintings and over 1,500 drawings. In March, 2016, on the 125th anniversary of his birth, the Villa Weber in Bielefeld officially became the Hermann-Stenner-Haus museum. The core of the collection was provided by Hermann-Josef Bunte, a legal scholar and art collector.

Selected paintings

References

Stenner, Hermann. In: Ulrich Thieme, Felix Becker et al.: Allgemeines Lexikon der Bildenden Künstler von der Antike bis zur Gegenwart. Vol.31, E. A. Seemann, Leipzig 1937, pg.593.
Stenner, Hermann. In: Hans Vollmer: Allgemeines Lexikon der bildenden Künstler des XX. Jahrhunderts. Vol.4. E. A. Seemann, Leipzig 1958, pg.357

Further reading 
 Jutta Hülsewig-Johnen and Nicole Peterlein (eds.): Hermann Stenner – Aquarelle und Zeichnungen (watercolors and drawings), Prestel Verlag, 2010, .
 Hermann Stenner 1891–1914. Von Bielefeld nach Meersburg – Ein Maler an der Schwelle zur Moderne. (exhibition catalog, Achberg Castle) 2007, .
 Karin von Maur and Markus Pöhlmann (eds.), Der Maler Hermann Stenner im Spiegel seiner Korrespondenz. Briefe 1909–1914. (letters) Prestel Verlag, 2006, .
 Jutta Hülsewig-Johnen and Christiane Reipschläger (eds.): Hermann Stenner – Werkverzeichnis der Gemälde. (working drawings), Auflage. 2005, .
 David Riedel: "Noch einen Sommer intensives Schaffen" – Hermann Stenners Werk vor dem Ersten Weltkrieg. Chapter from Sie starben jung! Künstler und Dichter, Ideen und Ideale vor dem Ersten Weltkrieg. (They Died Young) edited by Friederike Weimar and Burcu Dogramaci, Gebrüder Mann Verlag, 2014, .

External links 

Hermann Stenner website with biography and paintings by year.
 

1891 births
1914 deaths
20th-century German painters
20th-century German male artists
German male painters
German Expressionist painters
German graphic designers
People from Bielefeld
German military personnel killed in World War I